Storm Warning! is the fourth Dick Morrissey Quartet album. It was recorded live at The Bull's Head, London, on 22 and 29 November 1965. It was reissued around 1996 by HomeGrown Records.

Reception
A reviewer for The Irish Times commented that the piano was "somewhat strangely recorded", but that the album was "a marvellous example of straight ahead, inventive and highly individual mainstream/bop".

Track listing 

 "Storm Warning" - (Harry South)
 "What Is There to Say" - (Vernon Duke, Yip Harburg)
 "Come Rain Or Come Shine" - (Harold Arlen, Johnny Mercer)
 "Wind of Change" - (Harry South)
 "Get Out of Town" - (Cole Porter)
 "March On" - (Dick Morrissey)

Personnel 

Dick Morrissey - tenor sax
Harry South - piano
Phil Bates - double bass
Phil Seamen - drums

References 

Dick Morrissey albums
1965 live albums
Mercury Records live albums